The following is a timeline of the history of feminism.

18th century 
1700: A Serious Proposal to the Ladies for the Advancement of Their True and Greatest Interest and Some Reflections on Marriage published by Mary Astell.
 1791: Declaration of the Rights of Woman and of the Female Citizen published by Olympe de Gouges.
 1792: A Vindication of the Rights of Woman published by Mary Wollstonecraft.
 1793: Society of Revolutionary Republican Women is founded in France.

19th century
 First-wave feminism was a period of feminist activity and thought that occurred within the 19th and early 20th century throughout the world. It focused on legal issues, primarily on gaining women's suffrage (the right to vote).
 1854: “A Brief Summary in Plain Language of the Most Important Laws Concerning Women”, published by Barbara Bodichon.
 1869: The Subjection of Women published by John Stuart Mill and Harriet Taylor Mill.
 1872: Declaration of Rights of the Women of the United States published by Susan B. Anthony.

1910s
 1911: The Man-made world published by Charlotte Perkins Gilman.
 1913 British suffragette Emily Davison ran in front of the king's horse and died at the Epsom Derby race.
 1919: The Wages of Men and Women: Should They be Equal? published by Beatrice Webb.

1920s
 1929: A Room of One's Own by Virginia Woolf published.

1940s
 1949: The Second Sex by Simone de Beauvoir published.

1960s
 1963: The Feminine Mystique was published; it is a book written by Betty Friedan which is widely credited with starting the beginning of second-wave feminism in the United States. Second-wave feminism was a period of feminist activity and thought that began in the early 1960s in the United States, and spread throughout the Western world and beyond. In the United States the movement lasted through the early 1980s.
 Black feminism became popular in response to the sexism of the civil rights movement and racism of the feminist movement. 
 Body Positivity Feminism originated in the late 1960s. Body Positivity feminism is a social movement that incorporates feminist themes of equality, social justice, and cultural analysis based on the weight, curves, and general appearance of a woman or a non-binary feminine person.
 Radical feminism emerged in the United States. It is a perspective within feminism that calls for a radical reordering of society in which male supremacy is eliminated in all social and economic contexts. That said, radical feminists also recognize that  women's experiences differ according to other divisions in society such as race and sexual orientation.
 1967: "The Discontent of Women", by Joke Kool-Smits, was published; the publication of this essay is often regarded as the start of second-wave feminism in the Netherlands. In this essay, Smit describes the frustration of married women, saying they are fed up being solely mothers and housewives.
 1969: Chicana feminism, also called Xicanisma, is a sociopolitical movement in the United States that analyzes the historical, cultural, spiritual, educational, and economic intersections of Mexican-American women that identify as Chicana. The 1969 Chicano Youth Liberation Conference began the Chicano movement and eventually, MEChA. At the conference, women began to get involved in the male-dominated dialogue to address feminist concerns. After the conference, women returned to their communities as activists and thus began the Chicana feminist movement.

1970s
 In its modern form, the Jewish feminist movement can be traced to the early 1970s in the United States. According to Judith Plaskow, the main grievances of early Jewish feminists were women's exclusion from the all-male prayer group or minyan, women's exemption from positive time-bound mitzvot (mitzvot meaning the 613 commandments given in the Torah at Mount Sinai and the seven rabbinic commandments instituted later, for a total of 620), and women's inability to function as witnesses and to initiate divorce in Jewish religious courts.
  In the 1970s, French feminist theorists approached feminism with the concept of écriture féminine (which translates as female, or feminine writing). 
 The term materialist feminism emerged in the late 1970s; materialist feminism highlights capitalism and patriarchy as central in understanding women's oppression. Under materialist feminism, gender is seen as a social construct, and society forces gender roles, such as bearing children, onto women. Materialist feminism's ideal vision is a society in which women are treated socially and economically the same as men. The theory centers on social change rather than seeking transformation within the capitalist system.

1980s
 The radical lesbian movement is a francophone lesbian movement roughly analogous to English-language lesbian separatism. Inspired by the writings of philosopher Monique Wittig, the movement originated in France in the early 1980s, spreading soon after to the Canadian province of Quebec.
 In Turkey and Israel, second-wave feminism began in the 1980s.
 Difference feminism was developed by feminists in the 1980s, in part as a reaction to popular liberal feminism (also known as "equality feminism"), which emphasizes the similarities between women and men in order to argue for equal treatment for women. Difference feminism, although it is still aimed at equality between men and women, emphasizes the differences between men and women and argues that identicality or sameness are not necessary in order for men and women, and masculine and feminine values, to be treated equally. Liberal feminism aims to make society and law gender-neutral, since it sees recognition of gender difference as a barrier to rights and participation within liberal democracy, while difference feminism holds that gender-neutrality harms women "whether by impelling them to imitate men, by depriving society of their distinctive contributions, or by letting them participate in society only on terms that favor men".
 Equity feminism (also stylized equity-feminism) is a form of liberal feminism discussed since the 1980s, specifically a kind of classical liberal feminism and libertarian feminism.

1990s
 The Beauty Myth by Naomi Wolf published.
 Third-wave feminism is associated with the emergence of riot grrrl, the feminist punk subculture, in the early 1990s in Olympia, Washington. In 1991 Anita Hill testified in Washington, D.C. to an all-male, all-white Senate Judiciary Committee that Clarence Thomas, nominated for the Supreme Court of the United States, had sexually harassed her. Rebecca Walker responded to Thomas's appointment with an article in Ms. Magazine, "Becoming the Third Wave" (1992), which coined the term third wave: "Do not vote for them unless they work for us. Do not have sex with them, do not break bread with them, do not nurture them if they don't prioritize our freedom to control our bodies and our lives. I am not a post-feminism feminist. I am the Third Wave." The third wave focused on abolishing gender-role stereotypes and expanding feminism to include women of all races, classes and cultures.

2010s
 Fourth-wave feminism began around 2012 and is characterized by a focus on the empowerment of women and the use of internet tools, and is centered on intersectionality.

See also
 Timeline of feminism in the United States

References

Society-related timelines